Ursula Braun-Moser (25 May 1937 – 2 May 2022) was a German politician. A member of the Christian Democratic Union of Germany, Alternative for Germany, and later the Liberal Conservative Reformers, she served in the European Parliament from 1984 to 1989 and again from 1990 to 1994. She died in Bad Vilbel on 2 May 2022 at the age of 84.

References

1937 births
2022 deaths
20th-century German women politicians
Christian Democratic Union of Germany MEPs
Alternative for Germany politicians
Liberal Conservative Reformers politicians
Members of the European Parliament for Germany
MEPs for Germany 1984–1989
MEPs for Germany 1989–1994
Université libre de Bruxelles alumni
Politicians from Frankfurt
21st-century German women politicians